Ramsey Lake State Recreation Area is a  state park located in Fayette County, Illinois, United States.  The nearest town is Ramsey, Illinois, and the park is adjacent to U.S. Highway 51.  The park is managed by the Illinois Department of Natural Resources (IDNR).

Hunting, fishing, and boating
The Illinois Department of Natural Resources (IDNR) manages Ramsey Lake State Recreation Area (SRA) for a variety of active recreational uses, including boating, fishing, and hunting. The reservoir is named after Ramsey Creek, a tributary of the Kaskaskia River.

Before the creation of the state park, this parcel of property was called the Old Fox Chase Grounds; and Ramsey Lake occupies a valley named Fox Hunt Hollow in honor of the annual fox hunts that were hosted here by the Central Illinois Foxhunter's Association.  Hunting today centers on whitetail deer, which are hunted by bow only, upland birds such as mourning doves, pheasants, quail, and wild turkey, and small game such as coyotes, raccoons, and squirrels.

Ramsey Lake is stocked with largemouth bass, bluegill, catfish, crappie, and sunfish.  There is a power limit on the lake (electric motors only).  The state park also contains six small fishing ponds and 24 small vernal ponds and patches of non-fishing wetland managed for frogs and other amphibia.

Other outdoor recreation opportunities are provided by a network of state park trails, headed by the  Equestrian Trail and the  Old Fox Chase Grounds Trail.

Illinois Natural Area
A disjunct land parcel, the Ramsey Railroad Prairie, is managed by IDNR from the nearby state recreation area. It is classified by IDNR as dry-mesic and mesic prairie.

Historically, the prairie grows on a strip of land originally granted to the Illinois Central Railroad in 1850 to construct what was planned to be the railroad's central Illinois main line from Centralia, Illinois to Peru, Illinois.  The economic boom of the 1850s in Chicago caused the Illinois Central's Chicago spur line to supplant the railroad's original main line.  The Centralia-Peru line was eventually de-emphasized and abandoned.  The railroad prairie was dedicated as an Illinois Natural Area in October 1997.

References

External links

Protected areas of Fayette County, Illinois
State parks of Illinois
Reservoirs in Illinois
Protected areas established in 1947
1947 establishments in Illinois
Landforms of Fayette County, Illinois